Paul Mifsud is a Maltese former professional snooker player.

Career
Mifsud turned professional in 1983, and in the primitive world rankings at this time, was placed 49th. He was relegated from the snooker tour two seasons later, and has since competed as an amateur.

Mifsud's most notable performance was in reaching the last 32 of the 1984 World Championship, where he lost 2–10 to Terry Griffiths. He was twice World Amateur champion, in 1985 and 1986, defeating Dilwyn John 11–6 in the former and Kerry Jones 11–9 in the latter, and had reached the final in 1976, where he lost 1–11 to the rising Doug Mountjoy.

Performance and rankings timeline

References

Maltese snooker players
Living people
Year of birth missing (living people)